Ranjit Singh (13 November 1780 – 27 June 1839), popularly known as Sher-e-Punjab or "Lion of Punjab", was the first Maharaja of the Sikh Empire, which ruled the northwest Indian subcontinent in the early half of the 19th century. He survived smallpox in infancy but lost sight in his left eye. He fought his first battle alongside his father at age 10. After his father died, he fought several wars to expel the Afghans in his teenage years and was proclaimed as the "Maharaja of Punjab" at age 21. His empire grew in the Punjab region under his leadership through 1839. Maharaja Ranjit Singh is mentioned as Jat in many contemporary sources.

Prior to his rise, the Punjab region had numerous warring misls (confederacies), twelve of which were under Sikh rulers and one Muslim. Ranjit Singh successfully absorbed and united the Sikh misls and took over other local kingdoms to create the Sikh Empire. He repeatedly defeated invasions by outside armies, particularly those arriving from Afghanistan, and established friendly relations with the British.

Ranjit Singh's reign introduced reforms, modernisation, investment into infrastructure and general prosperity. His Khalsa army and government included Sikhs, Hindus, Muslims and Europeans. His legacy includes a period of Sikh cultural and artistic renaissance, including the rebuilding of the Harmandir Sahib in Amritsar as well as other major gurudwaras, including Takht Sri Patna Sahib, Bihar and Hazur Sahib Nanded, Maharashtra under his sponsorship. Ranjit Singh was succeeded by his son Kharak Singh. 

In 2020, Ranjit Singh was named as "Greatest Leader of All Time" in a poll conducted by 'BBC World Histories Magazine'.

Early years

Ranjit Singh was born in a Jat Sikh family on 13 November 1780 to Maha Singh and Raj Kaur in Gujranwala, Punjab region (present-day Punjab, Pakistan). His mother Raj Kaur was the daughter of Sikh Raja Gajpat Singh of Jind. Upon his birth, he was named Buddh Singh after his ancestor who was first in line to take Amrit Sanchaar. The child's name was changed to Ranjit (literally, "victor in battle") Singh ("lion") by his father to commemorate his army's victory over the Chatha chieftain Pir Muhammad.

Ranjit Singh contracted smallpox as an infant, which resulted in the loss of sight in his left eye and a pockmarked face. He was short in stature, never schooled, and did not learn to read or write anything beyond the Gurmukhi alphabet. However, he was trained at home in horse riding, musketry and other martial arts.

At age 12, his father died. He then inherited his father's Sukerchakia Misl estates and was raised by his mother Raj Kaur, who, along with Lakhpat Rai, also managed the estates. The first attempt on his life was made when he was 13, by Hashmat Khan, but Ranjit Singh prevailed and killed the assailant instead. At age 18, his mother died and Lakhpat Rai was assassinated, and thereon he was helped by his mother-in-law from his first marriage.

According to the chronicles of Ranjit Singh's court historians and the Europeans who visited him, Ranjit Singh took to alcohol and opium, habits that intensified in the later decades of his life. However, he neither smoked nor ate beef, and required all officials in his court, regardless of their religion, to adhere to these restrictions as part of their employment contract.

Personal life

Wives

In 1789, Ranjit Singh married his first wife Mehtab Kaur, the muklawa happened in 1796. She was the only daughter of Gurbaksh Singh Kanhaiya and his wife Sada Kaur, and the granddaughter of Jai Singh Kanhaiya, the founder of the Kanhaiya Misl. This marriage was pre-arranged in an attempt to reconcile warring Sikh misls, wherein Mehtab Kaur was betrothed to Ranjit Singh in 1786. However, the marriage failed, with Mehtab Kaur never forgiving the fact that her father had been killed in battle with Ranjit Singh's father and she mainly lived with her mother after marriage. The separation became complete when Ranjit Singh married Datar Kaur of the Nakai Misl in 1797 and she turned into Ranjit's most beloved wife. Mehtab Kaur had three sons, Ishar Singh who was born in 1804 and twins Sher Singh and Tara Singh born in 1807. According to historian Jean-Marie Lafont, she was the only one to bear the title of Maharani. She died in 1813, after suffering from a failing health.

His second marriage was to, Datar Kaur (Born Raj Kaur) the youngest child and only daughter of Ran Singh Nakai, the third ruler of the Nakai Misl and his wife Karmo Kaur. They were betrothed in childhood by Datar Kaur's eldest brother, Sardar Bhagwan Singh, who briefly became the chief of the Nakai Misl, and Ranjit Singh's father Maha Singh. The anand karaj took place in 1792 and the muklawa happened in 1797; this marriage was a happy one. Ranjit Singh always treated Raj Kaur with love and respect. Since Raj Kaur was also the name of Ranjit Singh's mother, she was renamed Datar Kaur. In 1801, she gave birth to their son and heir apparent, Kharak Singh. Datar Kaur bore Ranjit Singh two other sons, Rattan Singh and Fateh Singh. Like his first marriage, the second marriage also brought him strategic military alliance. She was exceptionally intelligent and assisted him in affairs of the State. During the expedition to Multan in 1818, she was given command alongside her son, Kharak Singh.Throughout her life she remained Ranjit Singh's favorite  and for no other did he have greater respect for than Datar Kaur, who he affectionately called Mai Nakain.  Even though she was his second wife she became his principal wife and chief consort. During a hunting trip with Ranjit Singh, she fell ill and died on 20 June 1838.
Ratan Kaur and Daya Kaur were wives of Sahib Singh Bhangi of Gujrat (a misl north of Lahore, not to be confused the state of Gujarat). After Sahib Singh's death, Ranjit Singh took them under his protection in 1811 by marrying them via the rite of chādar andāzī, in which a cloth sheet was unfurled over each of their heads. The same with Roop Kaur, Gulab Kaur, Saman Kaur, and Lakshmi Kaur,  looked after Duleep Singh when his mother Jind Kaur was exiled. Ratan Kaur had a son Multana Singh in 1819, and Daya Kaur had two sons Kashmira Singh and Pashaura Singh in 1821.

Jind Kaur, the final spouse of Ranjit Singh. Her father, Manna Singh Aulakh, extolled her virtues to Ranjit Singh, who was concerned about the frail health of his only heir Kharak Singh. The Maharaja married her in 1835 by 'sending his arrow and sword to her village'. On 6 September 1838 she gave birth to Duleep Singh, who became the last Maharaja of the Sikh Empire.

His other wives included, Mehtab Devi of Kangara also called Guddan or Katochan and Raj Banso, daughters of Raja Sansar Chand of Kangra.

He was also married to Rani Har Devi of Atalgarh, Rani Aso Sircar and Rani Jag Deo According to the diaries, that Duleep Singh kept towards the end of his life, that these women presented the Maharaja with four daughters. Dr. Priya Atwal notes that the daughters could be adopted. Ranjit Singh  was also married to Jind Bani or Jind Kulan, daughter of Muhammad Pathan from Mankera and Gul Bano, daughter of Malik Akhtar from Amritsar.

Ranjit Singh married many times, in various ceremonies, and had twenty wives. Sir Lepel Griffin, however, provides a list of just sixteen wives and their pension list. Most of his marriages were performed through chādar andāz. Some scholars note that the information on Ranjit Singh's marriages is unclear, and there is evidence that he had many concubines. Dr. Priya Atwal presents an official list of Ranjit Singh's thirty wives. The women married through chādar andāzī were noted as concubines and were known as the lesser title of Rani (queen). While Mehtab Kaur and Datar Kaur officially bore the title of Maharani (high queen), Datar Kaur officially became the Maharani after the death of Mehtab Kaur in 1813. Throughout her life was referred to as Sarkar Rani. After her death, the title was held by Ranjit's youngest widow Jind Kaur. According to Khushwant Singh in an 1889 interview with the French journal Le Voltaire, his son Dalip (Duleep) Singh remarked, "I am the son of one of my father's forty-six wives." Dr. Priya Atwal notes that Ranjit Singh and his heirs entered a total of 46 marriages. But Ranjit Singh was known not be a "rash sensualist" and commanded unusual respect in the eyes of others. Faqir Sayyid Vaḥiduddin states: "If there was one thing in which Ranjit Singh failed to excel or even equal the average monarch of oriental history, it was the size of his harem." George Keene noted, "In hundreds and in thousands the orderly crowds stream on. Not a bough is broken of a wayside tree, not a rude remark to a woman".

Punishment by the Akal Takht

In 1802, Ranjit Singh married Moran Sarkar, a Muslim nautch girl. This action, and other non-Sikh activities of the Maharaja, upset orthodox Sikhs, including the Nihangs, whose leader Akali Phula Singh was the Jathedar of the Akal Takht. When Ranjit Singh visited Amritsar, he was called outside the Akal Takht, where he was made to apologise for his mistakes. Akali Phula Singh took Ranjit Singh to a tamarind tree in front of the Akal Takht and prepared to punish him by flogging. Then Akali Phula Singh asked the nearby Sikh pilgrims whether they approved of Ranjit Singh's apology. The pilgrims responded with Sat Sri Akal and Ranjit Singh was released and forgiven. An alternative holds that Ranjit went to visit Moran on his arrival in Amritsar before paying his respects at Harmandir Sahib Gurdwara, which upset orthodox Sikhs and hence was punished by Akali Phula Singh. Iqbal Qaiser and Manveen Sandhu make alternative accounts on the relationship between Moran and the Maharaja; the former stating they never married, while the latter state that they married. Court chronicler, Sohan Lal Suri makes no mention Moran's marriage to the Maharaja or coins being struck in her name. Bibi Moran spent the rest of life in Pathankot. Duleep Singh makes a list of his father's queens which also does not mention Bibi Moran.

Issue

 Kharak Singh (22 February 1801 – 5 November 1840) was the eldest and the favorite of Ranjit Singh from his second and favorite wife, Datar Kaur. He succeeded his father as the Maharaja. 
 Ishar Singh son of his first wife, Mehtab Kaur. This prince died in infancy in 1805. 
 Rattan Singh (1805–1845) was born to Maharani Datar Kaur. He was granted the Jagatpur Bajaj estate as his jagir. 
 Sher Singh (4 December 1807 – 15 September 1843) was elder of the twins of Mehtab Kaur. He briefly became the Maharaja of the Sikh Empire. 
 Tara Singh (4 December 1807 – 1859) younger of the twins born of Mehtab Kaur. 
 Multana Singh (1819–1846) son of Ratan Kaur.
 Kashmira Singh (1821–1844) son of Daya Kaur. 
 Pashaura Singh (1821–1845) younger son of Daya Kaur. 
 Duleep Singh (4 September 1838 – 22 October 1893), the last Maharaja of the Sikh Empire. Ranji Singh's youngest son, the only child of Jind Kaur.
According to the pedigree table and Duleep Singh's diaries that he kept towards the end of his life mention another son Fateh Singh was born to Mai Nakain, who died in infancy. According to Henry Edward only Datar Kaur and Jind Kaur's sons are Ranjit Singh's biological sons.

It is said that Ishar Singh was not the biological son of Mehtab Kaur and Ranjit Singh, but only procured by Mehtab Kaur and presented to Ranjit Singh who accepted him as his son. Tara Singh and Sher Singh had similar rumors, it is said that Sher Singh was the son of a chintz weaver, Nahala and Tara Singh was the son of Manki, a servant in the household of Sada Kaur. Henry Edward Fane, the nephew and aide-de-camp to the Commander-in-Chief, India, General Sir Henry Fane, who spent several days in Ranjit Singh's company, reported,
"Though reported to be the Maharaja's son, Sher Singh's father has never thoroughly acknowledged him, though his mother always insisted on his being so. A brother of Sher, Tara Singh by the same mother, has been even worse treated than himself, not being permitted to appear at court, and no office given him, either of profit or honour." Five Years in India, Volume 1
Henry Edward Fane, London, 1842

Multana Singh, Kashmira Singh and Pashaura Singh were sons of the two widows of Sahib Singh, Daya Kaur and Ratan Kaur, that Ranjit Singh took under his protection and married. These sons, are said to be, not biologically born to the queens and only procured and later presented to and accepted by Ranjit Singh as his sons.

Establishment of the Sikh Empire

Historical context
After the death of Aurangzeb in 1707, the Mughal Empire fell apart and declined in its ability to tax or govern most of the Indian subcontinent. In the northwestern region, particularly the Punjab, the creation of the Khalsa community of Sikh warriors by Guru Gobind Singh accelerated the decay and fragmentation of the Mughal power in the region. Raiding Afghans attacked the Indus river valleys but met resistance from both organised armies of the Khalsa Sikhs as well as irregular Khalsa militias based in villages. The Sikhs had appointed their own zamindars, replacing the previous Muslim revenue collectors, which provided resources to feed and strengthen the warriors aligned with Sikh interests. Meanwhile, colonial traders and the East India Company had begun operations in India on its eastern and western coasts.

By the second half of the 18th century, the northwestern parts of the Indian subcontinent (now Pakistan and parts of north India) were a collection of fourteen small warring regions. Of the fourteen, twelve were Sikh-controlled misls (confederacies), one named Kasur (near Lahore) was Muslim controlled, and one in the southeast was led by an Englishman named George Thomas. This region constituted the fertile and productive valleys of the five rivers – Jhelum, Chenab, Ravi, Bias and Sutlej. The Sikh misls were all under the control of the Khalsa fraternity of Sikh warriors, but they were not united and constantly warred with each other over revenue collection, disagreements, and local priorities; however, in the event of external invasion such as from the Muslim armies of Ahmed Shah Abdali from Afghanistan, they would usually unite.

Towards the end of 18th century, the five most powerful misls were those of Sukkarchakkia, Kanhayas, Nakkais, Ahluwalias and Bhangi Sikhs. Ranjit Singh belonged to the first, and through marriage had a reliable alliance with Kanhayas and Nakkais. Among the smaller misls, some such as the Phulkias misl had switched loyalties in the late 18th century and supported the Afghan army invasion against their Khalsa brethren. The Kasur region, ruled by Muslim, always supported the Afghan invasion forces and joined them in plundering Sikh misls during the war.

Military campaigns

Rise to fame, early conquests

Ranjit Singh's fame grew in 1797, at age 17, when the Afghan Muslim ruler Shah Zaman, of the Ahmad Shah Abdali dynasty, attempted to annex Panjab region into his control through his general Shahanchi Khan and 12,000 soldiers. The battle was fought in the territory that fell in Ranjit Singh controlled misl, whose regional knowledge and warrior expertise helped resist the invading army. This victory gained him recognition. In 1798, the Afghan ruler sent in another army, which Ranjit Singh did not resist. He let them enter Lahore, then encircled them with his army, blocked off all food and supplies, burnt all crops and food sources that could have supported the Afghan army. Much of the Afghan army retreated back to Afghanistan.

In 1799, Raja Ranjit Singh's army of 25,000 Khalsa, supported by another 25,000 Khalsa led by his mother-in-law Rani Sada Kaur of Kanhaiya misl, in a joint operation attacked the region controlled by Bhangi Sikhs centered around Lahore. The rulers escaped, marking Lahore as the first major conquest of Ranjit Singh. The Sufi Muslim and Hindu population of Lahore welcomed the rule of Ranjit Singh. In 1800, the ruler of Jammu region ceded control of his region to Ranjit Singh.

In 1801, Ranjit Singh proclaimed himself as the "Maharaja of Punjab", and agreed to a formal investiture ceremony, which was carried out by Baba Sahib Singh Bedi – a descendant of Guru Nanak. On the day of his coronation, prayers were performed across mosques, temples and gurudwaras in his territories for his long life. Ranjit Singh called his rule as "Sarkar Khalsa", and his court as "Darbar Khalsa". He ordered new coins to be issued in the name of Guru Nanak named the "NanakShahi" ("of the Emperor Nanak").

Expansion

In 1802, Ranjit Singh, aged 22, took Amritsar from the Bhangi Sikh misl, paid homage at the Harmandir Sahib temple, which had previously been attacked and desecrated by the invading Afghan army, and announced that he would renovate and rebuild it with marble and gold.

On 1 January 1806, Ranjit Singh signed a treaty with the British officials of the East India Company, in which he agreed that his Sikh forces would not attempt to expand south of the Sutlej river, and the Company agreed that it would not attempt to militarily cross the Sutlej river into the Sikh territory.

In 1807, Ranjit Singh's forces attacked the Muslim ruled Kasur and, after a month of fierce fighting in the Battle of Kasur defeated the Afghan chief Qutb-ud-Din, thus expanding his empire northwest towards Afghanistan. He took Multan in 1818, and the whole Bari Doab came under his rule with that conquest. In 1819, he successfully defeated the Afghan Sunni Muslim rulers and annexed Srinagar and Kashmir, stretching his rule into the north and the Jhelum valley, beyond the foothills of the Himalayas.

The most significant encounters between the Sikhs in the command of the Maharaja and the Afghans were in 1813, 1823, 1834 and in 1837. In 1813, Ranjit Singh's general Dewan Mokham Chand led the Sikh forces against the Afghan forces of Shah Mahmud led by Fateh Khan Barakzai. The Afghans lost their stronghold at Attock in that battle.

In 1813–14, Ranjit Singh's first attempt to expand into Kashmir was foiled by Afghan forces led by General Azim Khan, due to a heavy downpour, the spread of cholera, and poor food supply to his troops.

In 1818, Darbar's forces led by Kharak Singh and Misr Dewan Chand occupied Multan, killing Muzaffar Khan and defeating his forces, leading to the end of Afghan influence in the Punjab.

In July 1818, an army from the Punjab defeated Jabbar Khan, a younger brother of governor of Kashmir Azim Khan, and acquired Kashmir, along with a yearly revenue of Rs seventy lacs. Dewan Moti Ram was appointed governor of Kashmir.

In 1823, Yusufzai Pashtuns fought the army of Ranjit Sing north of the Kabul River.

In 1834, Mohammed Azim Khan once again marched towards Peshawar with an army of 25,000 Khattak and Yasufzai tribesmen in the name of jihad, to fight against infidels. The Maharaja defeated the forces. Yar Mohammad was pardoned and was reinvested as governor of Peshawar with an annual revenue of Rs one lac ten thousand to Lahore Darbar.

In 1837, the Battle of Jamrud, became the last confrontation between the Sikhs led by him and the Afghans, which displayed the extent of the western boundaries of the Sikh Empire.

On 25 November 1838, the two most powerful armies on the Indian subcontinent assembled in a grand review at Ferozepore as Ranjit Singh, the Maharajah of the Punjab brought out the Dal Khalsa to march alongside the sepoy troops of the East India Company and the British troops in India. In 1838, he agreed to a treaty with the British viceroy Lord Auckland to restore Shah Shoja to the Afghan throne in Kabul. In pursuance of this agreement, the British army of the Indus entered Afghanistan from the south, while Ranjit Singh's troops went through the Khyber Pass and took part in the victory parade in Kabul.

Geography of the Sikh Empire

The Sikh Empire, also known as the Sikh Raj and Sarkar-a-Khalsa, was in the Punjab region, the name of which means "the land of the five rivers". The five rivers are the Beas, Ravi, Sutlej, Chenab and Jhelum, all of which are tributaries of the river Indus.

The geographical reach of the Sikh Empire under Singh included all lands north of Sutlej river, and south of the high valleys of the northwestern Himalayas. The major towns at time included Srinagar, Attock, Peshawar, Bannu, Rawalpindi, Jammu, Gujrat, Sialkot, Kangra, Amritsar, Lahore and Multan.

Muslims formed around 70%, Hindus formed around 24%, and Sikhs formed around 6–7% of the total population living in Singh's empire

Governance

Ranjit Singh allowed men from different religions and races to serve in his army and his government in various positions of authority. His army included a few Europeans, such as the Frenchman Jean-François Allard, though Singh maintained a policy of refraining from recruiting Britons into his service, aware of British designs on the Indian subcontinent. Despite his recruitment policies, he did maintain a diplomatic channel with the British; in 1828, he sent gifts to George IV and in 1831, he sent a mission to Simla to confer with the British Governor General, William Bentinck; while in 1838, he cooperated with them in removing the hostile Islamic Emir in Afghanistan.

Religious Policies

As consistent with many Punjabis of that time, Ranjit Singh was a secular king and followed the Sikh path. His policies were based on respect for all communities, Hindu, Sikh and Muslim. A devoted Sikh, Ranjit Singh restored and built historic Sikh Gurdwaras – most famously, the Harmandir Sahib, and used to celebrate his victories by offering thanks at the Harmandir. He also joined the Hindus in their temples out of respect for their sentiments. The veneration of cows was promoted and cow slaughter was punishable by death under his rule. He ordered his soldiers to neither loot nor molest civilians.

He built several gurdwaras, Hindu temples and even mosques, and one in particular was Mai Moran Masjid, built on the behest of his beloved Muslim wife, Moran Sarkar. The Sikhs led by Singh never razed places of worship to the ground belonging to the enemy. However, he did convert Muslim mosques into other uses. For example, Ranjit Singh's army desecrated Lahore's Badshahi Mosque and converted it into an ammunition store, and horse stables. Lahore's Moti Masjid (Pearl Mosque) was converted into "Moti Mandir" (Pearl Temple) by the Sikh army, and Sonehri Mosque were converted into a Sikh Gurdwara, but upon the request of Sufi Fakir (Satar Shah Bukhari), Ranjit Singh restored the latter back to a mosque. Lahore's Begum Shahi Mosque was also used as a gunpowder factory, earning it the nickname Barudkhana Wali Masjid, or "Gunpowder Mosque."

Singh's sovereignty was accepted by Afghan and Punjabi Muslims, who fought under his banner against the Afghan forces of Nadir Shah and later of Azim Khan. His court was ecumenical in composition: his prime minister, Dhian Singh, was a Dogra; his foreign minister, Fakir Azizuddin, was a Muslim; and his finance minister, Dina Nath, was a Brahmin. Artillery commanders such as Mian Ghausa were also Muslims. There were no forced conversions in his time. His wives Bibi Mohran, Gilbahar Begum retained their faith and so did his Hindu wives. He also employed and surrounded himself with astrologers and soothsayers in his court.

Ranjit Singh had also abolished the gurmata and provided significant patronage to the Udasi and Nirmala sect, leading to their prominence and control of Sikh religious affairs.

Administration

Khalsa Army
 

The army under Ranjit Singh was not limited to the Sikh community. The soldiers and troop officers included Sikhs, but also included Hindus, Muslims and Europeans. Hindu Brahmins and people of all creeds and castes served his army, while the composition in his government also reflected a religious diversity. His army included Polish, Russian, Spanish, Prussian and French officers. In 1835, as his relationship with the British warmed up, he hired a British officer named Foulkes.

However, the Khalsa army of Ranjit Singh reflected regional population, and as he grew his army, he dramatically increased the Rajput and Jat Sikhs who became the predominant members of his army. In the Doaba region his army was composed of the Jat Sikhs, in Jammu and northern Indian hills it was Hindu Rajputs, while relatively more Muslims served his army in the Jhelum river area closer to Afghanistan than other major Panjab rivers.

Reforms

Ranjit Singh changed and improved the training and organisation of his army. He reorganised responsibility and set performance standards in logistical efficiency in troop deployment, manoeuvre, and marksmanship. He reformed the staffing to emphasise steady fire over cavalry and guerrilla warfare, improved the equipment and methods of war. The military system of Ranjit Singh combined the best of both old and new ideas. He strengthened the infantry and the artillery. He paid the members of the standing army from treasury, instead of the Mughal method of paying an army with local feudal levies.

While Ranjit Singh introduced reforms in terms of training and equipment of his military, he failed to reform the old Jagirs (Ijra) system of Mughal middlemen. The Jagirs system of state revenue collection involved certain individuals with political connections or inheritance promising a tribute (nazarana) to the ruler and thereby gaining administrative control over certain villages, with the right to force collect customs, excise and land tax at inconsistent and subjective rates from the peasants and merchants; they would keep a part of collected revenue and deliver the promised tribute value to the state. These Jagirs maintained independent armed militia to extort taxes from the peasants and merchants, and the militia prone to violence. This system of inconsistent taxation with arbitrary extortion by militia, continued the Mughal tradition of ill treatment of peasants and merchants throughout the Sikh Empire, and is evidenced by the complaints filed to Ranjit Singh by East India Company officials attempting to trade within different parts of the Sikh Empire.

According to historical records, states Sunit Singh, Ranjit Singh's reforms focused on military that would allow new conquests, but not towards taxation system to end abuse, nor about introducing uniform laws in his state or improving internal trade and empowering the peasants and merchants. This failure to reform the Jagirs-based taxation system and economy, in part led to a succession power struggle and a series of threats, internal divisions among Sikhs, major assassinations and coups in the Sikh Empire in the years immediately after the death of Ranjit Singh; an easy annexation of the remains of the Sikh Empire into British India followed, with the colonial officials offering the Jagirs better terms and the right to keep the system intact.

Infrastructure investments
Ranjit Singh ensured that Panjab manufactured and was self-sufficient in all weapons, equipment and munitions his army needed. His government invested in infrastructure in the 1800s and thereafter, established raw materials mines, cannon foundries, gunpowder and arm factories. Some of these operations were owned by the state, others operated by private Sikh operatives.

However, Ranjit Singh did not make major investments in other infrastructure such as irrigation canals to improve the productivity of land and roads. The prosperity in his Empire, in contrast to the Mughal-Sikh wars era, largely came from the improvement in the security situation, reduction in violence, reopened trade routes and greater freedom to conduct commerce.

Muslim accounts
The mid 19th-century Muslim historians, such as Shahamat Ali who experienced the Sikh Empire first hand, presented a different view on Ranjit Singh's Empire and governance. According to Ali, Ranjit Singh's government was despotic, and he was a mean monarch in contrast to the Mughals. The initial momentum for the Empire building in these accounts is stated to be Ranjit Singh led Khalsa army's "insatiable appetite for plunder", their desire for "fresh cities to pillage", and eliminating the Mughal era "revenue intercepting intermediaries between the peasant-cultivator and the treasury".

According to Ishtiaq Ahmed, Ranjit Singh's rule led to further persecution of Muslims in Kashmir, expanding the previously selective persecution of Shia Muslims and Hindus by Afghan Sunni Muslim rulers between 1752 and 1819 before Kashmir became part of his Sikh Empire. Bikramjit Hasrat describes Ranjit Singh as a "benevolent despot".
The Muslim accounts of Ranjit Singh's rule were questioned by Sikh historians of the same era. For example, Ratan Singh Bhangu in 1841 wrote that these accounts were not accurate, and according to Anne Murphy, he remarked, "when would a Musalman praise the Sikhs?" In contrast, the colonial era British military officer Hugh Pearse in 1898 criticised Ranjit Singh's rule, as one founded on "violence, treachery and blood". Sohan Seetal disagrees with this account and states that Ranjit Singh had encouraged his army to respond with a "tit for tat" against the enemy, violence for violence, blood for blood, plunder for plunder.

Decline

Singh made his empire and the Sikhs a strong political force, for which he is deeply admired and revered in Sikhism. After his death, empire failed to establish a lasting structure for Sikh government or stable succession, and the Sikh Empire began to decline. The British and Sikh Empire fought two Anglo-Sikh wars with the second ending the reign of Sikh Empire. Sikhism itself did not decline.

Clive Dewey has argued that the decline of the empire after Singh's death owes much to the jagir-based economic and taxation system which he inherited from the Mughals and retained. After his death, a fight to control the tax spoils emerged, leading to a power struggle among the nobles and his family from different wives. This struggle ended with a rapid series of palace coups and assassinations of his descendants, and eventually the annexation of the Sikh Empire by the British.

Death and legacy

Death

In the 1830s, Ranjit Singh suffered from numerous health complications as well as a stroke, which some historical records attribute to alcoholism and a failing liver. He died in his sleep on 27 June 1839. Four of his Hindu wives- Mehtab Devi (Guddan Sahiba), daughter of Raja Sansar Chand, Rani Har Devi, the daughter of Chaudhri Ram, a Saleria rajput, Rani Raj Devi, daughter of Padma Rajput and Rani Rajno Kanwar, daughter of Sand Bhari along with seven Hindu concubines with royal titles committed sati by voluntarily placing themselves onto his funeral pyre as an act of devotion.

Singh is remembered for uniting Sikhs and founding the prosperous Sikh Empire. He is also remembered for his conquests and building a well-trained, self-sufficient Khalsa army to protect the empire. He amassed considerable wealth, including gaining the possession of the Koh-i-Noor diamond from Shuja Shah Durrani of Afghanistan, which he left to Jagannath Temple in Puri, Odisha in 1839.

Gurdwaras
Perhaps Singh's most lasting legacy was the restoration and expansion of the Harmandir Sahib, the most revered Gurudwara of the Sikhs, which is now known popularly as the "Golden Temple". Much of the present decoration at the Harmandir Sahib, in the form of gilding and marblework, was introduced under the patronage of Singh, who also sponsored protective walls and water supply system to strengthen security and operations related to the temple. He also directed construction of two of the most sacred Sikh temples, being the birthplace and place of assassination of Guru Gobind Singh – Takht Sri Patna Sahib and Takht Sri Hazur Sahib, respectively – whom he much admired. The nine-story tower of Gurdwara Baba Atal was constructed during his reign.

Memorials and museums
Samadhi of Ranjit Singh in Lahore, Pakistan, marks the place where Singh was cremated, and four of his queens and seven concubines committed sati.
On 20 August 2003, a 22-foot-tall bronze statue of Singh was installed in the Parliament of India.
A museum at Ram Bagh Palace in Amritsar contains objects related to Singh, including arms and armour, paintings, coins, manuscripts, and jewellery. Singh had spent much time at the palace in which it is situated, where a garden was laid out in 1818.
On 27 June 2019, a nine-feet bronze statue of Singh was unveiled at the Lahore Fort at his 180th death anniversary. It has been vandalised several times since, specifically by members of the Tehreek-e-Labbaik Pakistan.

Crafts 

In 1783, Ranjit Singh established a crafts colony of Thatheras near Amritsar and encouraged skilled metal crafters from Kashmir to settle in Jandiala Guru. In the year 2014, this traditional craft of making brass and copper products got enlisted on the List of Intangible Cultural Heritage by UNESCO. The Government of Punjab is now working under Project Virasat to revive this craft.

In popular culture
 Maharaja Ranjit Singh, a documentary film directed by Prem Prakash covers his rise to power and his reign. It was produced by the Government of India's Films Division.
In 2010, a TV series titled Maharaja Ranjit Singh aired on DD National based on his life which was produced by Raj Babbar's Babbar Films Private Limited. He was portrayed by Ejlal Ali Khan
Maharaja: The Story of Ranjit Singh (2010) is an Indian Punjabi-language animated film directed by Amarjit Virdi.
 A teenage Ranjit was portrayed by Damanpreet Singh in the 2017 TV series titled Sher-e-Punjab: Maharaja Ranjit Singh. It aired on Life OK produced by Contiloe Entertainment.

See also
 Baradari of Ranjit Singh
 History of Punjab
 Charat Singh
 Hari Singh Nalwa
 List of generals of Ranjit Singh
 Koh-i-Noor
 Battle of Balakot

References

Bibliography
 

Lafont, Jean-Marie Maharaja Ranjit Singh, Lord of the Five Rivers. Oxford: Oxford University Press, 2002 

Sandhawalia, Preminder Singh Noblemen and Kinsmen: history of a Sikh family. New Delhi: Munshiram Manoharlal, 1999 
Waheeduddin, Fakir Syed The Real Ranjit Singh; 2nd ed. Patiala: Punjabi University, 1981  (First ed. published 1965 Pakistan).

Further reading
Umdat Ut Tawarikh by Sohan Lal Suri, Published by Guru Nanak Dev University Amritsar .
 The Real Ranjit Singh by Fakir Syed Waheeduddin, published by Punjabi University, 1 January 2001, 2nd ed. First ed. published 1965 Pakistan.
 Maharaja Ranjit Singh: First Death Centenary Memorial, by St. Nihal Singh. Published by Languages Dept., Punjab, 1970.
 Maharaja Ranjit Singh and his times, by J. S. Grewal, Indu Banga. Published by Dept. of History, Guru Nanak Dev University, 1980.
 Maharaja Ranjit Singh, by Harbans Singh. Published by Sterling, 1980.
 Maharaja Ranjit Singh, by K. K. Khullar. Published by Hem Publishers, 1980.
 The reign of Maharaja Ranjit Singh: structure of power, economy and society, by J. S. Grewal. Published by Punjab Historical Studies Dept., Punjabi University, 1981.
 Maharaja Ranjit Singh, as patron of the arts, by Ranjit Singh. Published by Marg Publications, 1981.
 Maharaja Ranjit Singh: Politics, Society, and Economy, by Fauja Singh, A. C. Arora. Published by Publication Bureau, Punjabi University, 1984.
 Maharaja Ranjit Singh and his Times, by Bhagat Singh. Published by Sehgal Publishers Service, 1990. .
 History of the Punjab: Maharaja Ranjit Singh, by Shri Ram Bakshi. Published by Anmol Publications, 1991.
 The Historical Study of Maharaja Ranjit Singh's Times, by Kirpal Singh. Published by National Book Shop, 1994. .
 An Eyewitness account of the fall of Sikh empire: memories of Alexander Gardner, by Alexander Haughton Campbell Gardner, Baldev Singh Baddan, Hugh Wodehouse Pearse. Published by National Book Shop, 1999. .
 Maharaja Ranjit Singh: The Last to Lay Arms, by Kartar Singh Duggal. Published by Abhinav Publications, 2001. .
 Fauj-i-khas Maharaja Ranjit Singh and His French Officers, by Jean Marie Lafont. Published by Guru Nanak Dev University, 2002. .
 Maharaja Ranjit Singh, by Mohinder Singh, Rishi Singh, Sondeep Shankar, National Institute of Panjab Studies (India). Published by UBS Publishers' Distributors with National Institute of Panjab Studies, 2002. ,.
 Maharaja Ranjit Singh: Lord of the Five Rivers, by Jean Marie Lafont. Published by Oxford University Press, 2002. .
 The Last Sunset: The Rise and Fall of the Lahore Durbar, by Amarinder Singh. Published by Roli Books, 2010.
 Glory of Sikhism, by R. M. Chopra, Sanbun Publishers, 2001. Chapter on "Sher-e-Punjab Maharaja Ranjit Singh".

External links

Ranjit Singh profile from sikh-history.com
Ranjit Singh 
Foreign officers in Ranjit Singh's Court 
Detailed article on Ranjit Singh's Army
 , painted by W Harvey and engraved by G Presbury for Fisher's Drawing Room Scrap Book, 1838, with a poetical illustration by Letitia Elizabeth Landon.

Biographies

 
History of Sikhism
Punjabi people
Sikh Empire
Sikh warriors
Ranjit Singh
People from Gujranwala
History of Punjab
Indian Sikhs
1780 births
1839 deaths
Alcohol-related deaths in India
Deaths from cerebrovascular disease
Indian monarchs
Indian warriors
People from Lahore